Angelo Mazzoni (born 3 April 1961, in Milan) is an Italian épée fencer who competed at six consecutive Olympics between 1980 and 2000, winning gold in 1996 and 2000.

Career 

He was the eighth fencer, and the first Italian fencer, to compete at six Olympics. He was the third Italian, after Piero and Raimondo D'Inzeo, to compete at six Olympics.

At the World Championships, he placed third in 1983 and second in 1990. At the European Championships, he came first in 1981 and third in 1983.

He was coached by Italian coach Gianni Muzio. In February 2008, he and Muzio were hired by the Fencing Federation of Switzerland to be in charge of coaching the Switzerland men's and women's team for the 2012 London Olympics. In April 2014, Mazzoni decided to leave Switzerland and expressed the desire to return to Italy mainly for family reasons. After the 2014 World Fencing Championships the Russian Fencing Federation announced Mazzoni as the new coach of the Russian senior men's épée team.

See also
 List of athletes with the most appearances at Olympic Games

References

External links 
 
 
 
 
 

1961 births
Living people
Italian male fencers
Italian épée fencers
Fencers at the 1980 Summer Olympics
Fencers at the 1984 Summer Olympics
Fencers at the 1988 Summer Olympics
Fencers at the 1992 Summer Olympics
Fencers at the 1996 Summer Olympics
Fencers at the 2000 Summer Olympics
Olympic fencers of Italy
Olympic gold medalists for Italy
Olympic bronze medalists for Italy
Olympic medalists in fencing
Fencers from Milan
Medalists at the 1984 Summer Olympics
Medalists at the 1996 Summer Olympics
Medalists at the 2000 Summer Olympics
Italian fencing coaches
Fencers of Centro Sportivo Carabinieri